WCIP may refer to:

The Water Conservation Implementation Plan, a component of the Conserve Georgia program
We Come in Pieces, the 2011 live DVD by the alternative rock band Placebo
Wisconsin Council for Immunization Practices, part of the Wisconsin Department of Health Services
World Council of Indigenous Peoples, a non-governmental organization in operation from 1974 to 1996
WCIP (FM), a radio station (93.7 FM) licensed to serve Clyde, New York, United States